Ellastone is a civil parish in the district of East Staffordshire, Staffordshire, England.  It contains 33 buildings that are recorded in the National Heritage List for England.  Of these, three are listed at Grade II*, the middle grade, and the others are at Grade II, the lowest grade.  Historically, the most important building in the parish was Calwich Abbey, a priory that has been demolished and replaced by a country house, which is listed together with associated strictures in the surrounding parkland.  The parish contains the village of Ellastone and the surrounding countryside.  Here, most of the listed buildings are houses, cottages, farmhouses and farm buildings.  The other listed buildings include a church, bridges, and two mileposts.


Key

Buildings

References

Citations

Sources

Lists of listed buildings in Staffordshire